Jonathan Zion is an Australian musician; his main instruments are bass guitar and double bass.

Zion has been writing, performing, and recording professionally since he was eighteen years old, releasing his first single with the band Fibro House in 1989. In 1992 he completed a three-year Bachelor of Music degree at Victorian College of the Arts.  During this time he began writing and performing as a member of The Jenifers (with Stephen Magnusson, Colin Snape and Steve Heather). The Jenifers released three songs on a compilation featuring five Melbourne improvising ensembles called Solid through Larrikin Records.

In 1994 Zion joined the improvising ensemble "Kadoonka" (led by Dan West), performing at Monsalvat Jazz Festival in 1994, The Melbourne International Jazz Festival 2000, and Wangaratta Jazz Festival 2000. Kadoonka are currently performing around Melbourne and continue to develop new repertoire, and have currently released an album through Newmarket Records entitled By The Scruff.

Zion has also performed with numerous bands and artists across many genres, including Judy Jacques, Jack Jones, Joe Camilleri, Stephen Magnusson, Adam Simmons, Tony Gould, Graeme Lyall, Albare, Ross Hannaford, Mr Brown, Strumpet, Salamander, Tine Kopa's The Atman Project, Ruby Page,  Mark Antony and Pete Murray.

National touring included: Joan Armatrading, Randy Crawford, Hootie and the Blowfish, The Marvelous Three, and for local acts Neil Finn, The Whitlams, Leonardo's Bride, Horsehead, Rebecca's Empire, Mental as Anything, Noiseworks, James Reyne, Boom Crash Opera, Richard Franklin, and Motorace. International tours include four to North America with Mr Brown, and one tour to New Zealand with Strumpet as well as multiple European tours with Pete Murray.

Zion has taught at the Melba Conservatorium of Music (principal study (bass) and lecturer in Contemporary Ensemble), Victoria University of Technology (lecturer in music performance and communication subjects), Mount Scopus Memorial College (electric bass, careers seminars and music performance), Australian College of the Arts (lecturer in music business and music performance – improvisation).

He is currently a touring member of Cold Chisel's lead guitarist Ian Moss.

References

Australian bass guitarists
Living people
Year of birth missing (living people)
Academic staff of the Victoria University, Melbourne